Pueblo Rico (elevation 1560 m) is a town and municipality in the Department of Risaralda, Colombia.

References

Municipalities of Risaralda Department